The Rising Sun is a Grade II listed public house at Highwood Hill and 137 Marsh Lane, Mill Hill, London.

It was built in the late 17th century.

It is currently run by the Delneva brothers and functions as a restaurant, with an Italian/ Asian-influenced menu.

References

Grade II listed buildings in the London Borough of Barnet
Grade II listed pubs in London
Mill Hill
Pubs in the London Borough of Barnet